Harle Airfield, German: Flugplatz Harle , is a small airfield in Wangerland in the district of Friesland in Lower Saxony, Germany, about 700 meters from Harlesiel. However, the airfield has an address of the city of Wittmund, as its only access from Harlesiel is possible, which belongs to the Wittmund district Carolinensiel.

Airlines and destinations
The following airlines offer regular scheduled and charter flights at Harle Airfield:

References

External links

Buildings and structures in Lower Saxony
Airports in Lower Saxony
Wittmund (district)